is Susumu Hirasawa's second solo album.

Overview
The Ghost in Science is marked by a whimsical, futuristic thematic in which Hirasawa paints himself as a mad scientist. It has a sound similar to other Hirasawa albums of the same era, though puts greater emphasis on electronic elements.

Track listing
All tracks are written and arranged by Susumu Hirasawa except "Fish Song", cowritten by Akiro "Kamio" Arishima with strings coarranged by Kayo "Kokubo" Matsumoto.

"QUIT" contains a sample of "Haldyn Hotel", from the album Water in Time and Space.

Personnel
Susumu Hirasawa - vocals, guitars, bass (on "Fish Song"), timpani, percussion, autoharp, synthesizers, drum machine, sampler, sequencer, Amiga 2500 ("Say" program - Dreaming Machine voice on "QUIT"), programming, arrangements, co-production, computer graphics

additional musicians
Tuan Chin Kuan - voice (sampled) in "World Turbine"
 - female vocals on "World Turbine"
Jun Togawa (courtesy of Baidis Records) - backing vocals on "Rocket" & "Cowboy and Indian"
 (Varichef Homium) - backing vocals on "Rocket", bass on "Fish Song"
Yūichi Hirasawa,  (Here is Eden), Yuji Oda, Shigeru Fujishima, Masahiro Furukawa - backing vocals on "Rocket"
 - drums on "Fish Song"
Midori Ayabe, Hiroki Yamamoto, Nagisa Kiriyama and Yoshiaki Funayama - violin on "Fish Song" and "Techno Girl"
Kaori Kurimaru and Rika Morozumi - viola on "Fish Song" and "Techno Girl"
Hirohisa Miyata and Makoto Ohsawa - cello on "Fish Song" and "Techno Girl"
Kazutoki Umezu - alto saxophone and noise on "Cowboy and Indian"
Mamoru Kikuchi - Old Man's voice on "QUIT"
Hisashi "Dr. Ochanomizu" Katsuta - Laughing voice on "QUIT"
Kayo "Kokubo" Matsumoto - voice on "Techno Girl"

technical
Akiro Kamio Arishima - production
Yoshiaki Kondo (Gok Sound) - recording & mixing engineer
Meiji Takamatsu (Mix) - second engineer

visuals
Kiyoshi Inagaki (Asset) - art director
Naoki Wada (CG), Yosuke Komatu - photography
Yoshihiro Ariga - costume
Akemi Tsujitani - styling
Junko Maeda - hair & make-up

operations
I3 Promotion
Yūichi Kenjo - co-production, backing vocals on "Rocket"
Masami Fujii, Hiroyoshi Mitomi - artist management
Tsutomu Fukushima - stage director
Hiroki Yamaguchi - assistant
Katsuyuki Sawafuji - publicity coordination
Polydor K.K.
Kazuyoshi Aoki - A&R coordinator
Osamu Takeuchi - backing vocals on "Rocket", director

Thanks
AC Unit, Sky Corporation, Mamoru Kimura Office, Toshikazu Tamura, Keiji Kimura, Masaya Abe, Sazaby's Furniture

Release history

"Techno Girl" is included on the AD.POLICE - DRAGON TRIP drama CD.
"Fish Song" is the B-Side to the "Root of Spirit" single. 
"Rocket" and "Fish Song" were included on the Root of Spirit～ESSENCE OF HIRASAWA SOLO WORKS～ compilation.
"World Turbine", "Rocket", "Fish Song", "Dreaming Machine" and "Techno Girl" were included on the Archetype | 1989-1995 Polydor years of Hirasawa compilation.

References

External links
 
 サイエンスの幽霊 at iTunes Japan
 サイエンスの幽霊 at amazon.co.jp

Susumu Hirasawa albums
Japanese-language albums
1990 albums
Polydor Records albums
Sound collage albums
Electronic rock albums by Japanese artists
New-age albums by Japanese artists
Progressive rock albums by Japanese artists
Techno albums by Japanese artists
World music albums by Japanese artists